The Three Peaks Race is a fell race held annually on the last weekend in April, starting and finishing in Horton in Ribblesdale.

The course traverses the Yorkshire Three Peaks. The present distance is about 23 miles (37 km).

The first known circuits undertaken by athletes, as distinct from walkers, were not made until the winter of 1948/49.  Three Leeds climbers, Des Birch, Jack Bloor and Arthur Dolphin, who were also members of Harehills Harriers, completed the course in times varying from 4hrs 27mins to 5hrs 20mins, with Des Birch setting the first record at 4:27.

The first race was organised by Preston Harriers and took place in 1954 and it was thought that there was a good chance of Des Birch's time being beaten.  The conditions for the race were reasonably good but with a strong easterly wind making it feel cold. The start was at the Hill Inn, Chapel-le-Dale, with six runners taking part. Ingleborough was climbed first, where the competitors were bunched together after twenty-seven minutes, followed by Pen-y-ghent which was reached by the leader Fred Bagley in 1:48, one minute ahead of Stan Bradshaw. At the summit of the final peak, Whernside, Bagley's time of 3:28 gave him a lead of twelve minutes over Bradshaw, and the former returned to the Hill Inn with a total time of 3:48. Bradshaw finished in 4:06 and the third finisher was Alf Case in 5:02.

From 1964 onwards, the event was organised by the Three Peaks Race Association and in 1975 the race venue was transferred from Chapel-le-Dale to Horton in Ribblesdale.

Alterations which led to a longer or a more difficult course were taken in 1975, 1983 and 1987.

In 1981 the race was postponed due to heavy snowfall and took place in October. The 2001 edition was cancelled due to an outbreak of foot-and-mouth disease. The 2020 race was cancelled and the 2021 edition postponed due to the COVID-19 pandemic.

The 5th World Long Distance Mountain Running Challenge was incorporated into the 2008 race.

Winners

References

External links 

 
 Three Peaks Race at arrs.run

Fell running competitions
Athletics competitions in England
Sports competitions in Yorkshire
Yorkshire Three Peaks